Dhawankhan Nishan  is a village in Kapurthala district of Punjab State, India. The village is administrated by a Sarpanch, who is an elected representative.

Demography 
According to the report published by Census India in 2011, Dhawankhan Nishan has a total number of 45 houses and population of 234 of which include 118 males and 116 females. Literacy rate of Dhawankhan Nishan is  73.93%, lower than state average of 75.84%.  The population of children under the age of 6 years is 23 which is 9.83% of total population of Dhawankhan Nishan, and child sex ratio is approximately  1556, higher than state average of 846.

As per census 2011, 87 people were engaged in work activities out of the total population of Dhawankhan Nishan which includes 65 males and 22 females. According to census survey report 2011, 100.00% workers describe their work as main work and 0.00% workers are involved in Marginal activity providing livelihood for less than 6 months.

Population data

Caste  
The village has schedule caste (SC) constitutes 2.14% of total population of the village and it doesn't have any Schedule Tribe (ST) population.

Air travel connectivity 
The closest airport to the village is Sri Guru Ram Dass Jee International Airport.

Villages in Kapurthala

References

External links
  Villages in Kapurthala
 Kapurthala Villages List 

Villages in Kapurthala district